The Boss Is Mine is a 2016 Nigerian film directed Okechukwu Oku and written by Patrick Nnamani.

Plot
A successful young man employs a cook and cleaner to ease the pressure on his wife and the twist and turns that happens.

Cast
 Ime Bishop Umoh 
 Mike Godson 
 Sapphire Obi 
 Mary Ogbonna 
 Daniella Okeke

References

External links
 

2016 films
English-language Nigerian films
2010s English-language films